Nathaniel Cooke was the designer of a set of chess figures called the Staunton chess set which is now the standard set.

Chess set
Cooke registered his design at the United Kingdom Patent Office on 1 March 1849 under the Ornamental Designs Act of 1842. Cooke was the editor of The Illustrated London News, the newspaper where Howard Staunton wrote a regular chess column. Cooke asked Staunton to advertise his chess set. Staunton did so in his column on 8 September 1849, and the set became famous under the name Staunton rather than Cooke.

Other businesses
In addition, Cooke was an ambitious London-based publisher who, as Ingram, Cooke & Co., produced many volumes of history, travel guides, and other works. Ingram and Cooke were the proprietors of the mid-Victorian National Illustrated Library that failed in 1854 due to carrying an excess amount of titles:
When the National Illustrated Library was started, all were pleased and surprised at the appearance and price of the volumes, and it is certain that they would have paid; but a fatal error was made, almost at once, in commencing the publishing of other libraries at the same office, and in the purchasing at high prices old plates for republication; so many series came from the publisher ... that their advertisements were confusion worse confounded, and everybody was lost in the maze. The proprietor has now given up the business, not without a very serious loss.

Family tragedy
Herbert Ingram, Cooke's brother-in-law and publishing house partner, was the co-founder of The Illustrated London News. Herbert Ingram died in a maritime accident while traveling in the United States with his son. His steamer, the Lady Elgin, sank in Lake Superior when another passenger steamer, the Augusta, crashed into the Lady Elgin.
 

Of the Lady Elgin'''s 400 passengers, only 100 survived. The accident occurred near Winetka, Wisconsin, during an early September storm.

Spelling
Cooke's name was misspelled as "Cook" on the 1849 patent and the misspelling has propagated in chess literature since then. The correct spelling can be found in numerous documents, including his business listings in the London Directories (see top picture, right) as well as official announcements of the marriage of his daughter Harriet Ingram Cooke, to John Jaques II, son of John Jaques, the owner of the company that first manufactured the Staunton pieces in 1849 (see bottom picture, right'').

References

History of chess
Chess people
Year of birth unknown
Year of death unknown